DWBM (105.1 FM), on-air as Q Radio 105.1, is a radio station owned by Mareco Broadcasting Network and operated under an airtime lease agreement by Horizon of the Sun Communications. It serves as the flagship station of the Q Radio network. The station's studio is located along Tirad Pass Street, Santa Mesa Heights, Quezon City, while its transmitter is located in Barangay San Carlos, Binangonan, Rizal.

History

1963-1973: DZLM
Mareco Broadcasting Network (MBN) made its debut in the radio industry in March 1963. Its first AM station, DZLM 1430 kHz, originally served only as a promotional venue for Mareco's Mabuhay and Villar record labels. It also held the local license to produce and market foreign music labels from a peak of over a hundred major international recording companies. During this time, DZLM played the latest and widest variety of popular music and was consistent no. 1 in the surveys, contributing significantly in popularizing radio as a prime entertainment medium in Manila.

1973-1994: Move to FM
With its increasing listenership, DZLM was opened to commercial advertising. For superior quality, the station migrated from AM to FM and became known as DWLM SO FM at 105.1 MHz in 1973 and Super Tunog Pinoy 105.1 with an all-OPM format. In 1985, it rebranded as Power 105BM FM, switched to a new wave format and changed its callsign to DWBM.

1994-2019: Crossover

In the early 1990s, MBN underwent several changes in management as well as programming with the launch of 105.1 Crossover in June 1994 with a smooth jazz format. It managed to distinguish itself from rival station Citilite 88.3 by airing weekly programs that cater to different genres, like soul, Latin and R&B.

A few years later, Crossover expanded to the key provinces with 99.1 FM in Bacolod in 1994, 93.1 FM in Cebu City in 1995 (later moved to 90.7 FM), 93.1 FM in Davao City in 1997, and a relay station of Manila over 105.1 FM in Baguio in 2000. The Crossover format is also webcast worldwide in real time on their official website.

In June 2014, 105.1 Crossover celebrated its 20th year with the theme "Celebrating 20 Years of Great Music." At the same time, the station had its first disc jockey after almost a decade, Benjamin (Reuben "Beng" Chua formerly of Dream FM and Citylite), who boarded during weekday mornings.

2019-present: Q Radio
On December 30, 2019, 105.1 FM silently dropped its Crossover brand and smooth jazz format and switched to a Top 40 format, as MBN opted to lease the station's airtime to Horizon of the Sun Communications (producer of Chinese Filipino oriented shows Chinatown TV and Chinese News TV). The station announced on the following day that the Crossover FM format has migrated online (via its live stream application). Its Baguio relay station have also adopted the new format. While other MBN regional stations still broadcasts under the Crossover brand and format, they will soon follow suit with the Manila station.

On January 13, 2020, the station was officially launched as Q Radio. Former PBS deputy director general and former Quest Broadcasting Inc. executive Carlo Jose Magno Villo was brought in as the station's director, along with several DJs from various upscale stations.  It airs daily news updates with reporting segments on local and international news, business, entertainment and lifestyle.

On March 1, 2020, former Monster Radio jock and chief digital strategist Lexy Angeles took over management of the station. In the same month, the station launched new shows: Q Eclectic, a Saturday night  program that plays predominantly OPM, K-pop, C-pop, and Latin Pop, and Sunday Flashback, an all-day Sunday program which airs 2000s music.

On November 16, 2020, all MBNI provincial stations started carrying the Q Radio branding.

Crossover CD compilations
Pop Goes Jazz (Ivory Music Philippines, 1995)
Pop Goes Jazz 2 (Ivory Music Philippines, 1996)
Crossover Classic (Ivory Music Philippines, 1997)
Crossover Classic 2 (Ivory Music Philippines, 1997)
Unwind: The Crossover Classic Collection (Ivory Music Philippines, 1998)
Recall: The Crossover Collection (MCA Music Philippines, 1998)
Unwind 2: Another Crossover Classic Collection (Ivory Music Philippines, 1999)
Recall: Another Crossover Collection (MCA Music Philippines, 1999)
Crossover Rhythms (Universal Records, Inc., 1999)
Closer to Home (Viva Records Corp., 1999)
Classic: The Crossover Collection (Ivory Music Philippines, 1999)
Crossover Gold (Universal Records, Inc., 2000)
Closer to Home 2 (Viva Records, 2001)
The Greatest Crossover Classics Collection (MCA Music Philippines, 2002)
The Best of Crossover Live Presents (Viva Records, 2003)
Remakes & Revivals (Sony Music Philippines, 2004)
Soft & Warm (Warner Music Philippines, 2004)
The Definitive Crossover Collection (MCA Music Philippines, 2005)
The Big Easy (Universal Records, Inc., 2005)
The Greatest Crossover Love Songs Collection (PolyEast Records, 2006)
The Crossover Experience (MCA Music Philippines, 2011)
The Crossover Cafe: Smooth Jazz & Sweet Soul (MCA Music Philippines, 2014)
The Crossover Cafe 2 (MCA Music Philippines, 2015)

References

External links
 

Radio stations in Metro Manila
Contemporary hit radio stations in the Philippines
Radio stations established in 1963